An air base (sometimes referred to as a military air base, military airfield, military airport, air station, naval air station, air force station, or air force base) is an aerodrome used as a military base by a military force for the operation of military aircraft.

Air base facilities
An air base typically has some facilities similar to a civilian airport—for example, air traffic control and firefighting. Some military aerodromes have passenger facilities; for example RAF Brize Norton in England has a terminal used by passengers for the Royal Air Force's flights. A number of military air bases also have a civil enclave for commercial passenger flights, e.g. Beijing Nanyuan Airport (China), Chandigarh Airport (India), Ibaraki Airport (Japan), Burlington International Airport (USA),
Sheikh Ul-Alam International Airport Srinagar (India), Taipei Songshan Airport (Taiwan).

Some air bases have revetments, hardened aircraft shelters, or even underground hangars, to protect aircraft from enemy attack. Combat aircraft require storage of aircraft ordnance. An air base may be defended by anti-aircraft weapons and force protection troops.

Dispersal air base
A dispersal air base is an airfield that is used for the purpose of dispersing air units in the event of conflict, so to minimize the vulnerability of aircraft and its supporting units while on the ground. Dispersal air bases are not necessarily ordinarily operational in peace time and only becomes activated when needed. Airfields used as dispersal bases can either be auxiliary military airfields, civilian airports or highway strips. Examples of uses of dispersal bases are the Swedish Bas 60 and Bas 90 systems, the British V-Bomber dispersal bases and NATO's Dispersed Operating Bases in France.

Road air base

Road air bases are highways constructed to double as auxiliary air bases in the event of war. Nations known to utilize this strategy are India, Sweden, Finland, Germany, Singapore, Switzerland, South Korea, Turkey, Poland, Pakistan and the Czech Republic. In the case of Finnish road air bases, the space needed for landing aircraft is reduced by means of an arrestor wire, similar to that used on some aircraft carriers (Finnish Air Force uses F-18s, which can land on aircraft carriers).

Aircraft carrier

An aircraft carrier is a type of naval ship which serves as a seaborne air base, the development of which has greatly enhanced the capabilities of modern air forces.  They are now a key part of the military, allowing for military aircraft to be staged much nearer the theater conflict.  Aircraft carriers were vital to the United States during World War II and to the United Kingdom in the 1982 Falklands War. They retain modern roles as well as "several acres of sovereign territory a nation can move about at will", which allows greater flexibility in diplomacy as well as military affairs. Aircraft carriers are also used in disaster relief.

See also
 Naval air station
 List of Royal Australian Air Force installations
 List of Royal Canadian Air Force stations
 List of United States Air Force installations
 List of Soviet Air Force bases
 Naming of military air bases

References

Base
 
Airports by type